Luya is located in the south and west part of the department of Amazonas in Peru. Its territory, which partly is ceja de selva, is crossed by branches of the Cordillera Central  (namely the Cordillera Blanca) and the Oriental of the Andes, being rasped by deep streams, high pampas and snowed summit. It deserved to be named the streams of Hoyada Grande and Luya, the fertile valleys of Pizuquia and Cesuya, as well as the snow-capped mountains of Shube, Mesón and Santa Clara located in the Cordillera Oriental.

Its principal rivers are:

Marañon that flows from south to northwest and forms its extensive west limit with the department of Cajamarca
Utcubamba, which runs from south to north-east and forms its east boundary with the provinces of Chachapoyas and Bongará
Magunchal, which is born in the heights of the district of Colcamar, runs from south to north and ends into the Utcubamba, forming its most extensive and rich agricultural zone.

The province was created by law of February 5, 1861, has 23 districts and its capital is Lamud.

Political division
Luya is divided into twenty-three districts, which are:

See also 
 Kuntur Puna

Provinces of the Amazonas Region
1861 establishments in Peru